Bing's theorem may refer to 
Bing's recognition theorem
Bing metrization theorem

See also
R. H. Bing